Antonio Bonet Silvestre (14 August 1908 – March 1993) was a Spanish football midfielder and manager.

External links

Madridista stats 

1908 births
1993 deaths
Spanish footballers
Footballers from the Valencian Community
Association football forwards
La Liga players
Segunda División players
Real Madrid CF players
Granada CF footballers
Spanish football managers
La Liga managers
Segunda División managers
Granada CF managers
Real Murcia managers
Levante UD managers
Hércules CF managers
Real Madrid Castilla managers
CD Badajoz managers
Cultural Leonesa managers